Joaquim Jesus Vieira (17 March 1946 – 6 August 2022) was a Portuguese wrestler. He competed in the men's Greco-Roman 62 kg at the 1976 Summer Olympics.

References

1946 births
2022 deaths
Portuguese male sport wrestlers
Olympic wrestlers of Portugal
Wrestlers at the 1976 Summer Olympics